Empire Ace was a 275-ton tug which was built in 1942 for the Ministry of War Transport (MoWT). She was transferred to the Admiralty in 1947 and renamed  Diligent. She was transferred to the Ministry of Defence in 1961 and reverted to Empire Ace. She ran aground in 1968 and was scrapped in 1971.

History
Empire Ace was built by Cochrane & Sons Ltd, Selby as yard number 1255. She was launched on 12 September 1942 and completed on 22 December 1942.
 She was built for the MoWT. Empire Ace was sent to Malta. 

She was member of convoy RS-3 in March 1943. She was a member of Convoy KMS 25 which passed Gibraltar on 19 September 1943. She had sailed from Algiers with an unrecorded destination, but likely to have been Malta. Empire Ace was sunk during an air raid on Malta on 15 March 1944. On the 10 May she was salvaged and repairs were carried out. In 1947 she was transferred to the Admiralty and renamed Diligence. In 1961, Diligence was transferred to the Ministry of Defence and reverted to Empire Ace. She was loaned to the US Navy from December 1961 to December 1964, serving in Scotland. On 11 November 1968, she ran aground at Campbeltown in heavy seas and was abandoned. Empire Ace was refloated in June 1969 but declared a constructive total loss. She was scrapped at Campbelltown in 1971.

Official number and code letters
Official Numbers were a forerunner to IMO Numbers.

Empire Ace had the UK Official Number 1690781 and used the Code Letters MFLY.

References

1942 ships
Ships built in Selby
Empire ships
Ministry of War Transport ships
Ships sunk by aircraft
Steamships of the United Kingdom
Tugboats of the United Kingdom
Maritime incidents in March 1944
Maritime incidents in 1968